Concretene is a graphene-enhanced admixture for concrete that delivers savings on cost and CO2 emissions. The formulation has been developed by Nationwide Engineering Research & Development (NERD) in collaboration with The University of Manchester’s Graphene Engineering Innovation Centre (GEIC).

Laboratory tests and real-world projects have shown that Concretene offers significant benefits in compressive, tensile and flexural strength, as well as faster curing times and reduced permeability to water and salts. This enables comparable or greater performance to be achieved in concrete design mixes while using less cement.

Concretene is added at the batching plant, like any other admixture, meaning no additional training or equipment is required. The resulting mixture is poured like any other concrete and the admixture can be used with >99% of existing concretes.

Background 
After water, concrete is the most widely used substance on Earth but it has a very high carbon footprint, which gives the construction sector a problem amid pressure for greater sustainability in the industry. 

Concrete typically comprises sand, aggregate, water and cement and it is the cement part of the concrete that has the largest single CO2 emission impact. 

Approximately 14 billion m3 of concrete is poured globally each year, this equates to more than 32 billion tonnes or 1,070 tonnes per second. If concrete were a country, it would be the world’s third biggest CO2 polluter behind China and the USA. At the root of this problem is concrete’s reliance on cement. To keep up with this huge global demand, cement production is currently at around 150 tonnes per second. As a result, the global cement industry already accounts for around 8% of global CO2 emissions.

In 2021, worldwide emissions from making cement hit nearly 2.9 billion tonnes of CO2. This is twice the level recorded in 2002. Furthermore, the amount of pollution emitted per tonne - known as its ‘carbon intensity’ - has also increased in recent years.

History 
In 2019, Nationwide Engineering began working alongside scientists and engineers from Graphene Engineering Innovation Centre (GEIC) and found a way to significantly improve the performance of concrete by adding a graphene formulation into the hydration process. Performance increases above normal concrete were demonstrated in laboratory tests with the addition of Concretene, allowing the potential for cement content to be significantly reduced. 

In April 2021, the world's first pour of a graphene-enhanced concrete engineered for sustainability took place at site for the Southern Quarter gym in Amesbury, Wiltshire. Subsequently, in September 2021, a second pour took place at the GEIC, with a new parking/loading bay being installed alongside the facility.

Manchester's Mayfield Depot was the site for the next large-scale project in October 2021 - the first use of Concretene on a suspended floor as part of the Escape to Freight Island development. The deck has been used for ice-skating, roller-skating and as a fanzone for watching Six Nations rugby.

In December 2022, NERD announced funding of £8m from venture capital firm Local Globe for a development programme for Concretene towards commercial roll-out to the construction industry.

Properties 
Liquid concrete sets into its solid form through chemical reactions known as hydration and gelation, where the water and cement in the mixture react to form a paste that cures and hardens over time.

Graphene makes a difference by acting as a mechanical support with a very high surface area for the initial hydration reaction, leading to better bonding at microscopic scale and giving the finished product improved strength, durability and corrosion resistance.

Crucially, only very low dosages of the material, in some cases as little as 0.01%, are required to deliver substantial performance gains. This means Concretene is also commercially viable with wholesale costs expected to be in-line with existing additives already used in the concrete industry.

See also 
 Concrete
 Graphene

References

External links 
 

Concrete
Graphene
Building materials